Mumtaz Begum is an Indian politician. She was elected as MLA of Metiaburuz Vidhan Sabha Constituency in 2011 in West Bengal Legislative Assembly. She is an All India Trinamool Congress politician.

References

Year of birth missing (living people)
Trinamool Congress politicians from West Bengal
West Bengal MLAs 2011–2016
Women in West Bengal politics
Living people
21st-century Indian women politicians